Requena is a town in the Loreto Region in northeastern Peru. It is the capital of both Requena Province and Requena District and has a population of 25,313 (2017 census).

Populated places in the Loreto Region